Rhema 94.9 FM is a local Christian radio station broadcasting for the Central Coast, NSW, Australia.

External links

Christian radio stations in Australia
Radio stations in New South Wales